Chehr is a village in Shirez Rural District, Bisotun District, Harsin County, Kermanshah Province, Iran. At the 2006 census, its population was 2,129, in 501 families.

References 

Populated places in Harsin County